Sonoma County Airport station is a Sonoma–Marin Area Rail Transit train station in Santa Rosa,  east of Charles M. Schulz–Sonoma County Airport. It opened to preview service on July 1, 2017; full commuter service commenced on August 25, 2017. Until Phase 2 is completed, this will be the northern terminus of rail service on the line. Phase 1 was originally to extend only to Santa Rosa North, but in 2013 the MTC approved the addition of the airport station adjacent to the SMART Operations and Maintenance Facility.

Commute-hour timed-transfer buses connect commuters from as far north as Cloverdale station twice a day in each direction on Sonoma County Transit Line 56. Line 55 offers timed transfers connecting the train to the Charles M. Schulz–Sonoma County Airport and to the town of Windsor eight times daily.

The station was closed between October 28 and 31, 2019 due to the loss of power at railway crossings as a result of the 2019 California power shutoffs.

References

External links

SMART - Stations

Transportation in Santa Rosa, California
Railway stations in the United States opened in 2017
2017 establishments in California
Sonoma-Marin Area Rail Transit stations in Sonoma County
Airport railway stations in the United States